The 2013–14 season was Edinburgh Rugby's thirteenth season competing in the Pro12.

Team

Coaches
Alan Solomons, formerly of Western Province, Stormers, Ulster and more recently Super 15 team the Kings was appointed as Head Coach at the end of July '13. Stevie Scott, Philippe Doussy and Omar Mouneimne were appointed as Assistant Coaches.

Squad

 *Scottish qualified

Elite Development Players
  Alex Allan - Prop
  Chris Auld - Centre
  Magnus Bradbury - Back row
  Philip Cringle - Prop
  Bruce Dick - Centre
  Jamie Farndale - Wing
  Neil Irvine-Hess - Lock/Back row
  Ewan McQuillin - Prop
 / Alex Toolis - Lock
 / Ben Toolis - Lock
  George Turner - Hooker
  Hamish Watson - Back row

Transfers

Players In
  Nikki Walker from  Worcester Warriors
  Jack Cuthbert from  Bath Rugby
  Aleki Lutui from  Worcester Warriors
  Alasdair Dickinson from  Sale Sharks
  Grayson Hart from  NSW Waratahs
  Oliver Atkins from  NSW Waratahs
  Wicus Blaauw from  Biarritz
  James Hilterbrand from  Western Force
  Michael Tait from  Newcastle Falcons (Month loan from Falcons)
  Joaquín Domínguez from  San Isidro Club
  Cornell du Preez from the   /  Southern Kings
  Tomás Leonardi from  Southern Kings
  Mike Coman from  Hawke's Bay /  Huricannes
  Sam Beard from  Bay of Plenty
  Tony Fenner from  Viadana (Loan)
  Carl Bezuidenhout from 
  Andries Strauss from the   /  Southern Kings
 / Simon Berghan from  Sydenham RFC

Players Out
  Lee Jones to Scotland 7s (loan until the end of the season)
  Richie Rees to Newport Gwent Dragons
  Netani Talei to Newport Gwent Dragons
  Sep Visser released
  Mike Penn to Moseley
  Andy Titterrell to  London Welsh
  Allan Jacobsen retired
  James King retired
  Steven Turnbull retired
  John Yapp to London Irish
  Alun Walker to Nottingham RFC (loan until the end of the season)
  Robin Hislop to Rotherham R.U.F.C. (loan until the end of the season)
  Stuart McInally to Bristol RFC (loan until the end of the season)
  Ross Rennie to Bristol RFC (loan until the end of the season)
  Perry Parker to Ospreys (loan until the end of the season) 
  Lee Jones to Glasgow Warriors (loan until the end of the season)
  Sean Kennedy to London Irish (month loan) 
  Geoff Cross to Glasgow Warriors (loan until the end of the season)

Sponsorship
This year saw the shirts branded with BT Sport on four-year sponsorship and continuing relationship with sportswear company Macron. The BT Sports deals was seen as way to circumvent Sky Sports’ ban on carrying adverts for its new sports channels after agreeing a sponsorship deal under which its logo will be emblazoned all over BSkyB's Scottish rugby coverage.
 BT Sport
 Mitsubishi Cars

Competitions

Pro12

League table

Results

Round 1

Round 2

Round 3

Round 4

Round 5

Round 6

Round 7

Round 8

Round 9

Round 10

Round 11

Round 12

Round 13

Round 14

Round 15

Round 16

Round 17

Round 18

Round 13 rescheduled match

This match – originally scheduled to be held during Round 13, on 9 February 2014 – was postponed due to a waterlogged pitch.

Round 19

Round 20

Round 12 rescheduled match

This match – originally scheduled to be held during Round 12, on 1 January 2014 – was postponed due to a waterlogged pitch.

Round 21

Round 22

Heineken Cup

Table

Results

Round 1

Round 2

Round 3

Round 4

Round 5

Round 6

References

2013–14 in Scottish rugby union
2013-14
2013–14 Pro12 by team
2013–14 Heineken Cup by team